Tanja Gröpper (also spelled Groepper, born 5 March 1976) is a retired German Paralympic swimmer who competed in freestyle swimming events in international level events.

References

External links
 
  

1976 births
Living people
German female freestyle swimmers
German female breaststroke swimmers
Paralympic swimmers of Germany
Paralympic bronze medalists for Germany
Paralympic medalists in swimming
S6-classified Paralympic swimmers
Swimmers at the 2012 Summer Paralympics
Medalists at the 2012 Summer Paralympics
Medalists at the World Para Swimming Championships
Medalists at the World Para Swimming European Championships
Sportspeople from Dortmund
Sportspeople from Düsseldorf
20th-century German women
21st-century German women